Xol Qaraqaşlı (also, Xolqaraqaşlı, Khol-Karagashly, and Kholkarakashly) is a village and municipality in the Neftchala Rayon of Azerbaijan.  It has a population of 2,839.  The municipality consists of the villages of Xol Qaraqaşlı and Mürsəqulu.

References 

Populated places in Neftchala District